Donald E. Garrison (May 23, 1925 – August 13, 2018) was an American lawyer and politician.

Political career
He served as a Democratic member in the Texas House of Representatives from 1961 to 1966.

Biography
Garrison was born in Los Angeles, California. He graduated from El Monte High School, in El Monte, California. He served in the United States Army during World War II. He then went to Stanford University for three years. During the Korean War, Garrison served in the United States Air Force and was commissioned a captain. In 1964, Garrison received his law degree from South Texas College of Law and practiced law in Houston, Texas. He died at Berks Heim Nursing Facility in Leesport, Pennsylvania.

References

1925 births
2018 deaths
People from Houston
Politicians from Los Angeles
Military personnel from California
South Texas College of Law alumni
Stanford University alumni
Texas lawyers
Democratic Party members of the Texas House of Representatives
20th-century American lawyers